The Bullough Cup is a knock-out competition in the sport of shinty.

It is played for by reserve-level teams from the South District of Shinty, which includes all of Scotland South of Ballachulish as well as England. All teams playing in South Division Two, Kyles Athletic Seconds, Lochside Rovers, Inveraray Second Team, Glasgow Mid-Argyll Second Team, as well as non-league teams such as London Camanachd are eligible. Glasgow Mid-Argyll Second Team are the current holders, having won it in 2022.

History
The trophy was presented by Sir George Bullough, Victorian playboy and raconteur, who owned the hunting estate on the island of Rùm.  The trophy was first played for in 1906 with an abeyance for the Great War. Its early years saw the competition dominated by teams from North Argyll, then Oban. With the amalgamation of the Dunn and Southern Leagues, the trophy become more open. The trophy has had two significant periods of abeyance, one in the lead up to the Second World War, and the other in the mid-Sixties. There was also a shorter period in the 1990s.

Lochside Rovers were champions in 2009 defeating Kyles Athletic in a rearranged final in Tighnabruaich after the original final was called off.

The Bullough Cup has seen several interesting developments in recent years, in 2005 it was run as a league cup, which marked the re-entry of Col-Glen and London to competition as well as the first senior fixtures of Aberdour Shinty Club. It has also seen the first Camanachd Association fixture in England for 80 years and the victory by the Highlanders in 2006.

As of 2010, the opening rounds of the cup will be played midweek, in order to reduce the backlog of fixtures that has regularly afflicted shinty.

Glasgow Mid-Argyll won the 2010 cup defeating Kyles Athletic 3–1, and again in 2022 winning 2-0 against Kilmory.

In 2014, the Bullough Plate was created for first round losers to compete for and this was won by Glenorchy. The Bullough Plate was discontinued in 2015.

Winners
2022 Glasgow Mid-Argyll 2, Kilmory 0
2020/2021 No competition due to COVID-19
2019 Lochside Rovers 4, Glasgow Mid-Argyll 1
2018 Kyles Athletic 2, Lochside Rovers 5
2017 Inveraray 3, Strachur 2
2016 Tayforth 4, Kilmory 3
2015 Tayforth 4, Kyles Athletic 2
2014 Kyles Athletic 6, Inveraray 3 (Bullough Plate Winners: Glenorchy)
2013 Ballachulish 3, Kyles Athletic 0
2012 Lochside Rovers 6, Ballachulish 2
2011 Lochside Rovers 5, Aberdour 0
2010 Glasgow Mid-Argyll 3, Kyles Athletic 1 
2009 Lochside Rovers 6, Kyles Athletic 4 (A.E.T.)
2008 Lochside Rovers 4, Oban Celtic 1
2007 Inveraray
2006 The Highlanders 
2005 Lochside Rovers
2004 Kyles Athletic 4, Glasgow Mid-Argyll 1
2003 Inveraray
2002 Lochside Rovers
2001 Lochside Rovers
2000 No competition
1999 Lochside Rovers
1998 No competition
1997 No competition
1996 No competition
1995 Bute
1994 Strachur 8, Tayforth 1
1993 Ballachulish
1992 Kilmory
1991 Ballachulish 3, Tayforth 1 (A.E.T.)
1990 Inveraray
1989 Lochside Rovers
1988 Glenorchy
1987 Kyles Athletic
1986 Glenorchy
1985 Glenorchy
1984 Glenorchy
1983 Col-Glen
1982 No competition
1981 Ballachulish
1980 Ballachulish
1979 Kilmory
1978 Strachur
1977 Strachur
1976 Glenorchy
1975 Oban Celtic
1974 Oban Celtic
1973 Glenorchy
1972 Lochside Rovers
1971 Lochside Rovers
1970 Oban Celtic
1969 Oban Celtic
1968 Ballachulish
1967 No competition
1966 No competition
1965 No competition
1964 No competition
1963 Oban Celtic
1962 Inveraray
1961 Inveraray
1960 Lochside Rovers
1959 Inveraray
1958 Inveraray
1957 Lochside Rovers
1956 Lochside Rovers
1955 Strachur
1954 Appin
1953 Appin
1952 Appin
1951 Dunstaffnage
1950 Appin
1949 Oban Celtic
1935–1948 No Competition
1934 Lochside Rovers
1933 Lochside Rovers
1932 Lochside Rovers
1931 Oban Celtic
1930 Oban Celtic
1929 Oban Celtic
1928 Oban Celtic
1927 Lochside Rovers
1926 Lochside Rovers
1925 Lochside Rovers
1924 Ballachulish
1923 Lochside Rovers
1922 Duror Juniors
1921 Oban Camanachd Juniors
1920 Ballachulish
1914 Glencoe, after a replay with Appin 
1913 Oban Camanachd Juniors
1912 Oban Camanachd Juniors
1911 Inveraray
1910 Inveraray
1909 Kelburn, Oban
1908 Ballachulish
1907 Ballachulish
1906 Ballachulish

Wins By Clubs

References

Shinty competitions
1923 establishments in Scotland